Bolognesi may refer to:
 BAP Coronel Bolognesi, four ships of the Peruvian Navy 
 Bolognesi District, Pallasca Province, Ancash Region, Peru
 Bolognesi Province, Ancash Region, Peru
 Coronel Bolognesi, Peruvian football club

People with the surname
 Aureliano Bolognesi (born 1930), Italian boxer
 Francisco Bolognesi (1816–1880), Peruvian military hero
 Gaia Bolognesi (born 1980), Italian actress
 Gemma Bolognesi (1894–1983), Italian actress 
Jose Bolognesi, Brazilian footballer
 Maria Bolognesi (1924–1980), Roman Catholic Italian layperson
 Luiz Bolognesi (born 1966), Brazilian screenwriter
 Marco Bolognesi, Italian artist

See also
 Bologna (disambiguation)
 Bolognese (disambiguation)